A list of films produced by the Tollywood (Bengali language film industry) based in Kolkata in the year 1958.

A-Z of films

References

1958
Lists of 1958 films by country or language
Films, Bengali